Sri Sri may refer to:

 Sri Sri, an honorific title used for spiritual persons, see Sri
 Prabhat Ranjan Sarkar (1921–1990), founder of the social and spiritual movement Ananda Marga (the Path of Bliss)
 Ravi Shankar (spiritual leader) (born 1956), founder of the Art of Living Foundation
 Sri Sri (writer) (1910–1983), Telugu poet, and film lyricist
 Sri Sri (film), a 2016 Telugu drama film

See also

 SRI (disambiguation)